Ozeryany may refer to the following places in Ukraine:

Villages
Chernihiv Oblast
Ozeriany, Bobrovytsia Raion
Ozeriany, Varva Raion
Ivano-Frankivsk Oblast
Ozeriany, Halych Raion
Ozeriany, Tlumach Raion
Kherson Oblast
Ozeriany, Kherson Oblast
Rivne Oblast
Ozeriany, Rivne Oblast
Ternopil Oblast
Ozeriany, Borshchiv Hromada
Ozeriaany, Buchach Raion
Volyn Oblast
Ozeriany, Lutsk Raion
Ozeriany, Turiisk Raion
Zhytomyr Oblast
Ozeriany, Zhytomyr Oblast

See also
Jezierzany